Çavuş (Bozcaada Çavuşu), is a white prolific Turkish grape variety which is grown especially in Bozcaada-Çanakkale, Marmara Region and Central Anatolia Region.

Origin 
This variety has different hypotheses about its origin and spread, is known as Bozcaada Çavuşu in its home country since it is mostly grown in Bozcaada. As a result of the recent studies, Bozcaada Çavuşu was registered by the Turkish Trademark and Patent Authority in 2020 and received a geographical indication under the name of Bozcaada Çavuş Üzümü.

Viticulture 
Çavuş is an early ripening grape variety in the vineyard. Flowering period is sensitive. The bunch is large, the berries are very large, seeded and thin-skinned. The leaves of the vine are wide. Due to the preference of seedless grapes for table grape consumption, its market share in table grapes decreases.

Winemaking 
Although Bozcaada Çavuşu is a table grape variety, it has also used for white wine production, especially in Bozcaada recently. Wines from Çavuş are generally low in acidity and semi-aromatic. Çavuş wines are not suitable for aging.

References 

Grape varieties of Turkey
White wine grape varieties
Table grape varieties